Iron chloride may refer to:

 Iron(II) chloride (ferrous chloride, iron dichloride), FeCl2
 Iron(III) chloride (ferric chloride, iron trichloride), FeCl3